Thomas Bere may refer to:
 Thomas Bere (Bodmin MP), Member of Parliament for Bodmin 1391, 1395–7
 Thomas Bere, High Sheriff of Cornwall 1464–5
 Thomas Bere (1652–1725), Member of Parliament for Tiverton 1690–1710, 1715–25
Several other Thomas Beres of the Bere family of Huntsham